Mareo (written: 希生 or 真礼生) is a masculine Japanese given name. Notable people with the name include:

, Japanese composer

See also
Mario (given name)

Japanese masculine given names